Anisolabis hawaiiensis is a species of earwig in the genus Anisolabis, the family Anisolabididae, the suborder Forficulina, and the order Dermaptera. The species is native to Hawaii, and was first classified by Brindle in 1979.

References 

Anisolabididae
Endemic fauna of Hawaii
Insects described in 1979